Terence 'Noel' White (30 December 1923 – 20 June 2019) was an Australian rugby league footballer. He was one of only seven players to have represented New South Wales, Queensland and Australia in a 12-month period.  At the time of his death, he was Australia's oldest member of the Australia national rugby league team, being the last surviving member of Australia's 1946 team that played England for The Ashes in Australia.

White was a winger who was a noted sprinter.  He played club football in New South Wales for the Kurri Kurri Bulldogs, in Brisbane for Wests Panthers and in Townsville for Centrals ASA. In 1947 he captain-coached Centrals to their third Townsville first grade premiership.

He represented Country and NSW teams in 1945-46 before being chosen to play for Australia.  After moving to Townsville in 1947, he represented Queensland in four interstate matches against NSW before a serious knee injury forced him into retirement before the Kangaroos tour in 1948.

In 2010 White was named on the wing in Kurri Rugby League Club's Team of the Century, having played in the 1945 Grand Final-winning team.

References

1923 births
2019 deaths
Australian rugby league players
Kurri Kurri Bulldogs players
New South Wales rugby league team players
Queensland rugby league team players
Australia national rugby league team players
Wests Panthers players
Rugby league players from Kurri Kurri
Rugby league wingers